"This Is Our Night" is a song by Greek singer Sakis Rouvas, from the album Irthes. The song was written by Dimitris Kontopoulos, Craig Porteils and Cameron Giles-Webb. It is best known as the  entry at the Eurovision Song Contest 2009, held in Moscow.

The song was released as a digital download along with the other candidate songs from the national final on February 25 and was soon released as a three track CD single and then included on the re-release of Rouvas' 2008 album Irthes which was renamed This Is Our Night.

Background and composition
The song was produced by Dimitris Kontopoulos as one of the three candidates that Rouvas would sing for the Eurovision Song Contest 2009. The lyrics were written by two Greek Australian songwriters: Craig Porteils, who had previously written and produced hits for Cher, Billy Idol, Tevin Campbell, Richie Sambora, Guns N' Roses and Ozzy Osbourne; and Cameron Giles-Webb, the president of Gusto Music. It is described as being a "powerful dance song".

Regarding the song, Rouvas stated:

Music video and promotion
The music video for the song was filmed over two days over a total duration of 24 hours, finally wrapping up on 24 February, while it was also reported that it would take around three days afterward for the final processing to be completed. The video was directed by Katya Tsaryk, a young but well-known Ukrainian director who also created the video for the  "Shady Lady" for popular singer Ani Lorak, being choreographed by Fokas Evangelinos. The shooting took place in Athens, at two main locations: the first was at the STARZ club where Rouvas is performing along with the Maggira Sisters for the winter season, set in front of a huge screen and many flashing lights; while the second was at the King George suite hotel, where the morning shooting took place. The rest of the video was shot around the city life of Athens, some shot solely by the cameramen while other filming was taking place, and other scenes featuring Rouvas. During the filming at STARZ, the doors were opened at 23:00 where reporters were allowed to enter, while Evangelinos, and the song's composer, Dimitris Kontopoulos, as well as Rouvas' entire entourage and some ERT staff were also present.

MAD TV reported that the video features the strong beat of the song in combination with bright flashing lights in a dark setting that give an intense erotic sensation, also stating that the general concept of the video is of people in love surrounding Rouvas who wanders the city to showcase its most impressive sights. ERT stated that their production gave their best for the creation of the video, which features impressive Athenian scenery, beautiful landscapes, a lot of color, and scenes of people having fun and performing energetic choreography and the use of elaborate lighting that underpin the video clip along with a strong combination of Athenian culture. The director, Tsaryk, expressed how impressed she was with Rouvas' professionalism and capabilities.

Upon wrapping up filming, ERT released two backstage videos, and also stated that it would soon be released all over Europe as part of the promotion, while MAD TV also released a special photo report. On 10 March, ERT released a special preview, while the video officially premiered exclusively on 12 March on the official Eurovision/ert.gr site as well as on television on ERT-NET and ERT World for international audiences.

Eurovision Song Contest

National final

The song was presented as the last performance of the press conference held on 12 February 2009 where the three songs were revealed. The song was performed by Rouvas at the Greek National Final where it placed first.

At the end of voting, "This Is Our Night" was revealed as the winner receiving over eighty percent of the votes. "Right on Time" and "Out of Control" placed second and third respectively.

In Moscow

The song was performed in Moscow during the second semi-final on 14 May 2009 and was one of the ten performances which qualified for the grand final. The song therefore carried on Greece's Eurovision success by finishing within the top-ten for the sixth consecutive year, thus making the country the second most successful entrant of the past decade, despite not having even participated in 2000. The event was watched by 86% of the Greek television audience.

The performance had extremely complex choreography, with BBC News announcing that "Greece's Sakis Rouvas had one of the more ambitious dance routines". Rouvas performed on a rotating podium which transported him from left to right across the stage, was part of his group dance routine with four other performers and, in the end, was responsible for lifting him high into the air. In the same moment, a Greek flag is displayed on the floor, only visible to the television viewers. The final part of the performance was completed by silver fireworks in two separate parts. The official Eurovision website states that, this year, Greece had made "high-tech advancements" in the contest's standards.

Whilst Rouvas was disappointed with his seventh-place finish, announcing to Greek media "I am so sorry, I wanted us to win", there was still unanimous support towards the artist himself in the country. "Seventh in Europe, first in our hearts" many journalists reported on Greek television. The media and public pronounced their support for Rouvas, the general consensus being that the artist gave it his best even though this did not translate in enough votes in the contest. All criticism in Greece focused on the selection of the song itself, rather than the artist's performance. Rouvas stated that, overall, it has all been a wonderful experience for him: "some win, some lose, personally, I gave everything I had. But it was a wonderful experience".

Some critics, including those from London Greek Radio, suggested the reason why Greece failed to achieve a higher placing was due to a lack of an ethnic-sounding song. He notes the way in which all of Greece's top-three placings, including Rouvas' performance of "Shake It" in 2004, had an ethnic bouzouki sound, as did the 2009  and  entries which finished in third and fourth place respectively.

Track listing
Digital download
 "Right on Time" – 3:05
 "This Is Our Night" – 2:59
 "Out of Control" – 3:01

CD single
 "This Is Our Night" – 2:59
 "Right on Time" – 3:05
 "Out of Control" – 3:01

Release history

Chart performance

Charts

References

External links
Official Sakis Rouvas Homepage
Official ERT Eurovision Homepage

2009 singles
Synth-pop songs
English-language Greek songs
Eurovision songs of 2009
Eurovision songs of Greece
Greek-language songs
Music videos directed by Kostas Kapetanidis
Number-one singles in Greece
Sakis Rouvas songs
Songs written by Dimitris Kontopoulos
Minos EMI singles
2009 songs